The 2020 King Cup Final was the 45th final of the King Cup, Saudi Arabia's main football knock-out competition.

It was played at the King Fahd International Stadium, Riyadh, on 28 November 2020; it was originally scheduled for May but was delayed due to the COVID-19 pandemic in Saudi Arabia. The match was contested between Al-Hilal and Al-Nassr. It was Al-Hilal's 16th King Cup final and Al-Nassr's 14th. This was the fifth meeting between these two clubs in the final. The match was held behind closed doors.

Al-Hilal won the game 2–1 to secure their ninth title.

Teams

Venue

The King Fahd International Stadium was announced as the final venue on 13 November 2020. This was the seventh King Cup final hosted in the King Fahd International Stadium following those in 1988, 2008, 2009, 2010, 2013 and 2019.

The King Fahd International Stadium was built in 1982 and was opened in 1987. The stadium was used as a venue for the 1992, 1995, and the 1997 editions of the FIFA Confederations Cup. Its current capacity is 68,752 and it is used by the Saudi Arabia national football team, Al-Hilal, Al-Shabab, and major domestic matches.

Background
Al-Hilal reached their 16th final after a 2–0 win against Abha. This was Al-Hilal's first final since 2017, and fourth final since the tournament was reintroduced. Al-Hilal won their two most recent finals against Al-Ahli and Al-Nassr.

Al-Nassr reached their 14th final, after a 2–1 away win against Al-Ahli. This was Al-Nassr's first final since 2016, and fourth final since the tournament was reintroduced. Al-Nassr lost their three most recent finals against Al-Ahli twice and Al-Hilal once.

The two teams met earlier in the week in the fifth round of the Pro League. Al-Hilal defeated Al-Nassr 2–0 thanks to goals from Bafétimbi Gomis and Saleh Al-Shehri. This was the 19th meeting between these two sides in the King Cup and fifth meeting in the final. Al-Hilal won eight times including the 1989 Final, while Al-Nassr won four times including the 1981 Final and 1987 Final. The two teams drew each other six times, with Al-Hilal winning the 2015 Final on penalty shoot-outs. This was the 169th competitive meeting between these two sides.

Road to the final
Note: In all results below, the score of the finalist is given first (H: home; A: away).

Match

Details

{| width="100%"
|valign="top" width="40%"|

Statistics

See also

2019–20 King Cup
2019–20 Saudi Professional League
2020 Saudi Super Cup

Notes

References

External links

2020
Sports competitions in Saudi Arabia
November 2020 sports events in Asia
Al Hilal SFC matches
Al Nassr FC matches